Muhammad Haikal Nazri (born 26 December 2002) is a Malaysian badminton player. He won three titles in 2021: Austrian Open, Hellas International and Ukraine International tournaments in the men's doubles event partnered with Junaidi Arif.

Career 
Partnered with Junaidi Arif, they won the 2021 Austrian Open, Hellas, and Ukraine International. The duo also finished runners-up in the Latvia International and Scottish Open.

In 2022, they competed in the Syed Modi International Super 300 tournament. In April, they competed in the 2022 Orléans Masters but was forced to concede a walkover to Dutch pair Ruben Jille and Ties van der Lecq in the final after Haikal was tested positive for COVID-19. A few months later, they reached the quarterfinals of the Malaysia Masters. In May, he was competed at the Southeast Asian Games, and won the silver medal in the men's team event.

Achievement

BWF World Tour (2 runners-up) 
The BWF World Tour, which was announced on 19 March 2017 and implemented in 2018, is a series of elite badminton tournaments sanctioned by the Badminton World Federation (BWF). The BWF World Tours are divided into levels of World Tour Finals, Super 1000, Super 750, Super 500, Super 300, and the BWF Tour Super 100.

Men's doubles

BWF International Challenge/Series (4 titles, 2 runners-up) 
Men's doubles

  BWF International Challenge tournament
  BWF International Series tournament
  BWF Future Series tournament

References

External links 
 

2002 births
Living people
People from Kelantan
Malaysian people of Malay descent
Malaysian male badminton players
Competitors at the 2021 Southeast Asian Games
Southeast Asian Games silver medalists for Malaysia
Southeast Asian Games medalists in badminton
21st-century Malaysian people